JPT may refer to:

 JPT Scare Band, an American rock band
 JPT Bus Company, formerly operating in Greater Manchester, England
 EFL Trophy (formerly Johnstone's Paint Trophy), an English association football competition